Anathetis is a genus of moths of the family Noctuidae. The genus was erected by Anthonie Johannes Theodorus Janse in 1938.

Species
Anathetis atrirena (Hampson, 1902) South Africa, Namibia
Anathetis diversa Berio, 1976 Zaire
Anathetis melanofascia Janse, 1938 Zimbabwe, South Africa

References

External links

Acronictinae
Noctuoidea genera